Buruwai, also known as Sabakor, is an Asmat–Kamoro language spoken in New Guinea.

References

Kamrau Bay languages
Languages of western New Guinea